The APEC China 2014 was the 22nd annual gathering of APEC leaders. It was held in Yanqi Lake, Huairou District, Beijing on 10–12, November 2014.

Attendees
Prior to a two plane tragedies of Malaysia Airlines flight between MH370 and MH17, this was the first APEC meeting for Indonesian President Joko Widodo, Thai Prime Minister Prayuth Chan-ocha and Chilean President Michelle Bachelet (in her comeback) since their inaugurations on 20 October 2014, 22 May 2014 and 11 March 2014, respectively.

It was also the last APEC meeting for Australian Prime Minister Tony Abbott (who stepped down on September 15, 2015 following the 2015 Australian leadership spill) and Canadian Prime Minister Stephen Harper (who stepped down on November 4, 2015 following the 2015 Canadian federal election).

Preparations
According to journalist John Pomfret, China spent $6 billion on preparations for the summit.

China attempted to prevent Beijing's frequent smog from occurring during the meeting through various measures, including limiting driving and closing down factories in Beijing and the surrounding province of Hebei. The air was clear towards the beginning of the APEC week, but was predicted to be somewhat smoggy during the summit itself. The efforts created somewhat of a backlash among internet users, with the phrase "APEC blue" being coined to satirically refer to something fleeting.

Beijing banned subway riders from wearing Halloween costumes ahead of the event, citing public order concerns.

Events
Chinese President Xi Jinping and Japanese Prime Minister Shinzo Abe had a highly anticipated face-to-face meeting on November 10. Both leaders were described as looking noticeably dour in the photos of them taken prior to the meeting.

On November 12, Xi and Obama announced that their two nations would work to reduce greenhouse gases. The United States would cut their 2005 carbon emissions by 26% to 28% by 2025, while China would peak their carbon emissions by 2030 and strive to achieve 20% of its energy from sources that do not produce carbon emissions. This agreement marks the first time that China agreed to peak its carbon emissions.

Occupy Central leaders speculated on trying to "crash" the summit to protest Beijing's actions in Hong Kong, but were not allowed to enter Mainland China.

See also 
 Tangzhuang, the Chinese jacket given to world leaders at the event
Ninth East Asia Summit in Naypyidaw, Myanmar (held 12–13 November 2014, 13 of the 20 leaders met there again)
2014 G20 Brisbane summit in Brisbane, Australia (held 15–16 November 2014, nine of the 20 leaders met there again)

Notes

References

External links

2014
2014 in China
2014 in economics
Economy of China
Diplomatic conferences in China
21st-century diplomatic conferences (Asia-Pacific)
2014 in international relations
2014 conferences
History of Beijing
2010s in Beijing
November 2014 events in China